Helgoland Island is an island in the Svalbard archipelago, one of the islands of Kong Karls Land. It is located in the bay of Breibukta of Kongsøya. The island is named after the vessel Helgoland.

See also
 List of islands of Norway

References

Islands of Svalbard
Kong Karls Land